The 1996–97 New Jersey Devils season was the 23rd season for the National Hockey League franchise that was established on June 11, 1974, and 15th season since the franchise relocated from Colorado prior to the 1982–83 NHL season. The Devils captured the Atlantic Division title and finished first in the Eastern Conference, but fell in the second round of the playoffs to their arch-rivals, the New York Rangers.

The New Jersey Sports and Exposition Authority was contractually obligated to install a new US$600,000 sound system in Continental Airlines Arena prior to the start of the season.

Offseason
The Devils' head coach Jacques Lemaire expressed his disappointment following the team's loss to the Ottawa Senators in the final game of the 1995–96 season, the first time since 1970 that the defending Stanley Cup champion missed the playoffs in the following season. Lemare was quoted as saying that the team lacked confidence. He also felt that the media, the fans, and some players, misread his commitment to defensive hockey as a detriment to offensive creativity, stating that he never stopped his players from being creative in the offensive zone. He ended up needing to repair his relationship with Devils team captain Scott Stevens due to his comment following the Ottawa game that the team suffered from a "lack of leadership". Stevens reportedly saw the remark as a personal attack, and so himself and Lemare ended up sitting down together in order to discuss the comment. Lemare later stated to the media that the remark was intended to be an indictment of the entire team, himself included.

The 1996 NHL free agent market officially opened on July 1, 1996, following the passing of the June 30 deadline for teams to file contracts with the league. The largest name to become a free agent on July 1 was Wayne Gretzky, who was released from the St. Louis Blues after the team failed to reach an agreement with Gretzky's agent. The Mighty Ducks of Anaheim, Phoenix Coyotes and New York Rangers (who eventually signed him) were reported to have expressed interest in signing Gretzky, but New Jersey Devils general manager Lou Lamoriello told reporters Gretzky did not fit with the team's financial plan. Lamoriello did express a desire to retain Phil Housley, an offensive-minded defenseman who was acquired by the Devils late in the 1995–96 season but who had been released by the team after failing to be signed prior to the deadline. The Devils were unable to sign Housley though, who signed a US$7.7 million three-year deal that included a no-trade clause with the Washington Capitols on July 22, 1996. Lamoriello stated that the team didn't want to make a long term offer, and would not consider a no-trade clause. He reportedly felt that Housley's previous $2.2 million salary was "astronomical".

Speculation the Devils would trade for all-star center Jeremy Roenick, 26 years old at the time, began following the Ranger's signing of Gretzky. In late August, Lou Lamoriello confirmed to the media he was attempting to bring Roenick, a restricted free agent, to the Devils via a trade. Any team signing Roenick out from the Phoenix Coyotes would be required to give the Coyotes five first-round draft picks in compensation, and Lamoriello was quoted as saying, "I have no intentions right now of giving up draft picks." Rumors were reported in the media that Lamoriello considered dealing forwards Bill Guerin, Brian Rolston, Mike Peluso and defenseman Scott Niedermayer for Roenick. Reports the next day reiterated Lamoriello's interest in Roenick, both for the Devils and as a player for Team USA, also included the possibility of including Stephane Richer in a potential trade. However, Richer was traded back to the Montreal Canadiens the following day in exchange for 28-year-old Lyle Odelein, whom the Devils immediately signed to a three-year contract at approximately $1.5 million per season. Roenick eventually signed with the Coyotes, despite interest from the Devils and Capitols, among others.

Amid rumors that the Devils were interested in dealing with the Detroit Red Wings for hold-out center Keith Primeau, Devils center Bobby Holik did not show up to training camp in what was described as a surprising decision on his part to not report to the team. Speculation among teammates and the media was that he wanted a trade. Neal Broten, who was considering retirement at the time, and Mike Peluso, who had been benched by Lemaire during the 1995–96 season and thought that he would be traded over the summer, did report to training camp along with 60 other players. Several regular players who were involved with the 1996 World Cup of Hockey tournament were scheduled to report to camp late.

Draft
The New Jersey Devils were 10th in order of selection at the 1996 NHL Entry Draft, held June 22, 1996, in St. Louis. In a move interpreted to be an affirmation of their commitment to a defense-first philosophy, the Devils chose 6–3, 195-pound Lance Ward of the Western Hockey League's Red Deer Rebels, who had not been ranked anywhere near the tenth seed to observers, with their first pick.

"I was a bit surprised to go early because there are a lot of great players [here], but I'm a pretty happy kid right now," Ward said. "I was hoping to go in the first round but you never know what's going to happen. It was a pretty open field and I guess [the Devils] liked me. They flew me to Toronto for a physical test and an interview [last month] and I guess I did well." Devils general manager Lou Lamoriello was impressed with Ward's potential to be yet another hard-hitting New Jersey defenseman, stating, "We liked [Ward's] potential as far as his upside is concerned," Lamoriello said. "We have guys like Scott Stevens and Ken Daneyko on our team and this young man [is like them]. He's strong now, he's mean, and he's got skills."

During the draft, the Devils traded backup goaltender Corey Schwab to the Tampa Bay Lightning in exchange for their backup goalie Jeff Reese along with their second-round (47th overall) and eighth-round (198th overall) picks in the draft. The Devils then traded their original second round pick (28th overall) to the Pittsburgh Penguins in exchange for the Penguins' two second-round picks (41st and 47th overall).

Notes

Regular season
During the regular season, the Devils allowed the fewest goals (182), the fewest power-play goals (28), took the fewest penalties (235) and had the best penalty killing percentage (88.09%) in the league. Coincidentally, they also had the fewest power-play goals (40) and the fewest short-handed goals (4) in the league. Devils goaltenders combined to record 12 shutouts, the most in the NHL and 5 of those shutouts came in the final 10 games of the season.

Final standings

Schedule and results

Playoffs

Eastern Conference Quarterfinals

(E1) New Jersey Devils vs. (E8) Montreal Canadiens 
In the first game of the series against Montreal, on April 17, 1997, with the Devils up by two goals late in the game, Martin Brodeur fired the puck the length of the ice and into the Canadiens' empty net to ensure a 5–2 victory. It was only the second time in NHL history that a goaltender had scored in the playoffs, and the fifth time overall. In the game 2, the Devils were victorious by a score of 4-1. Games three and four were played at Molson Centre. The Devils won game 3 6-4. However, in game 4, Montreal was victorious by a score of 4-3 in the third overtime. Game 5 shifted back to New Jersey where the Devils shut out Montreal 4-0 and won the series 4-1.

Eastern Conference Semifinals

(E1) New Jersey Devils vs. (E5) New York Rangers 
The series opened at the Meadowlands. The Devils won 2–0 in Game 1, but New York evened the series in Game 2 by winning 2–0. Games 3 and 4 were played at Madison Square Garden. The Rangers won Game 3, 3–2, and Game 4, 3–0. Game 5 was back at the Meadowlands. New York won 2–1 in overtime and the series four games to one on a wraparound goal by Adam Graves to eliminate the Devils and advance.

Media
This was the final season of television broadcast coverage on SportsChannel New York as the channel would rebrand itself to Fox Sports Net New York the following season.

Player statistics

Regular season
Scoring

Goaltending

Playoffs
Scoring

Goaltending

Note: GP = Games played; G = Goals; A = Assists; Pts = Points; +/- = Plus/minus; PIM = Penalty minutes; PPG = Power-play goals; SHG = Short-handed goals; GWG = Game-winning goals
      MIN = Minutes played; W = Wins; L = Losses; T = Ties; GA = Goals against; GAA = Goals against average; SO = Shutouts; SA = Shots against; SV = Shots saved; SV% = Save percentage;

Awards and records

Awards

Nominations

References 
 Season statistics provided by 

New Jersey Devils seasons
New Jersey Devils
New Jersey Devils
New Jersey Devils
New Jersey Devils
20th century in East Rutherford, New Jersey
Meadowlands Sports Complex